Michael Vickers may refer to:

 Michael Vickers (bishop) (born 1929), area Bishop of Colchester
 Michael Vickers (artist) (born 1987), Canadian artist 
 Michael G. Vickers, (born 1953), American defense official
 Mike Vickers (born 1940), British musician